Julie Bowen Luetkemeyer (born March 3, 1970) is an American actress. She is best known for starring as Claire Dunphy in the ABC sitcom Modern Family (2009–2020), for which she received critical acclaim and six nominations for the Primetime Emmy Award for Outstanding Supporting Actress in a Comedy Series, winning in 2011 and 2012.

Bowen also starred as Roxanne Please in the NBC medical drama series ER (1998–1999), Carol Vessey in the NBC comedy series Ed (2000–2004), Denise Bauer in the ABC legal drama series Boston Legal (2005–2007), and Sarah Shephard in the ABC drama series Lost (2005–2007).

Bowen has also appeared in the films Happy Gilmore (1996), Multiplicity (1996), Joe Somebody (2001), Horrible Bosses (2011), Hubie Halloween (2020), and The Fallout (2021).

Early life
Bowen was born in Baltimore, Maryland, the second of three daughters of Suzanne (née Frey) and John Alexander Luetkemeyer Jr., a commercial real estate developer. She is the sister of noted infectious disease specialist Annie Luetkemeyer and designer Molly Luetkemeyer. Bowen is of German descent.

Raised in suburban Ruxton-Riderwood, Maryland, Bowen first attended Calvert School, then Garrison Forest School, Roland Park Country School, and St. George's School in Middletown, Rhode Island. She attended Brown University, majoring in Italian Renaissance studies. She spent her junior year in Florence, Italy. During college, she had roles in Guys and Dolls, Stage Door, and Lemon Sky. Before graduating, she had the lead role in the independent film Five Spot Jewel. Bowen studied acting at the Actor's Institute, among other places.

Career

Bowen had a role in the soap opera Loving (1992) and an episode of the college drama Class of '96 (1993). She had the lead role in the television film Runaway Daughters (1994). She played the love interest of the title character in Happy Gilmore (1996). She appeared in the films Multiplicity (1996) and An American Werewolf in Paris (1997). She has had guest roles on television series such as Party of Five (1996) and Strange Luck (1996).

Bowen had a recurring role as Roxanne Please on ER (1998–99). She first gained prominence on the television series Ed (2000–04), where she played high school English teacher Carol Vessey. She then guest starred as Sarah Shephard in five episodes of Lost (2005–07). She also played attorney Denise Bauer on the series Boston Legal (2005–08), and had a recurring role on Weeds (2008). She was a spokesmodel for Neutrogena, most recently advertising the Pure Glow products. She appeared on an episode of Celebrity Jeopardy! on August 31, 2010, and again on December 4, 2022.

From 2009 to 2020, Bowen starred as Claire Dunphy on the ABC sitcom Modern Family. For her portrayal, she received six consecutive Primetime Emmy Award nominations for Outstanding Supporting Actress in a Comedy Series (2010–15), winning the award in 2011 and 2012. Bowen has said that winning an Emmy is like "German soldiers in the trenches of the World Wars" and that "when you win the award, it is like being pulled out of the trench." She also said, "as exciting and wonderful as it is not to be in the trench, and to be recognized for what you do, it also means everyone has got a clear shot at you and that is a very frightening prospect for most of us."

In November 2021, Bowen's production company, Bowen & Sons, entered a first-look deal at Universal Television.

Personal life
Bowen suffers from the cardiovascular condition bradycardia: her regular heartbeat is below normal. As a result, she has had a pacemaker since her early twenties.

Bowen married Scott Phillips, a real estate investor and software developer, on September 9, 2004. They have three sons, the first born in April 2007, and twins born in May 2009, with whom she was visibly pregnant when shooting the pilot for Modern Family. She is a self-described "low Protestant." In February 2018, she filed for divorce from Phillips. It was finalized on September 13, 2018.

In 2016, Bowen appeared in "Fight Song", a Pitch Perfect-inspired music video shown at the Democratic National Convention in support of nominee Hillary Clinton.

Filmography

Film

Television

Awards and nominations

References

External links

 
 

1970 births
Living people
20th-century American actresses
21st-century American actresses
Actresses from Baltimore
American film actresses
American television actresses
American voice actresses
American people of German descent
Brown University alumni
Outstanding Performance by a Supporting Actress in a Comedy Series Primetime Emmy Award winners
People from Ruxton-Riderwood, Maryland
St. George's School (Rhode Island) alumni
American Protestants